The Grandmother is a novella written by Czech writer Božena Němcová in 1855. It is her most popular work and is regarded as a classic piece of Czech literature. This most frequently read book of the Czech nation was published more than 300 times in Czech alone and translated into 21 other languages.

Plot
The book describes, in an idealized form, the childhood of Němcová. The plot weaves together a remembrance of the agrarian calendar and customs of the neighborhood with the love stories of several women, which reveal more of the history and customs of that area. The main action of the novel seems to take place during the first one or two years after the Grandmother has come to live at the Old Bleachery with her daughter's family, to help manage the household. The father is frequently absent due to his job as equerry to the local noblewoman, which takes him away to Vienna during the winter. The principal action of the story is to tell the intertwining tales of Viktorka, Kristla, and the Countess. The author is identified with Barunka, the eldest daughter of the Prošek family; however, the novel is not told from her point of view.

See also

 Ratibořice

References

External links

 The Grandmother (public domain translation by Frances Gregor, 1891, in DjVu format)

1855 Czech novels
Novellas